The 7mm Remington Magnum rifle cartridge was introduced as a commercially available round in 1962, along with the new Remington Model 700 bolt-action rifle.  It is a member of the belted magnum family that is directly derived from the venerable .375 H&H Magnum. The original purpose of the belted magnum concept taken from the .300 H&H Magnum and .375 H&H Magnum, was to provide precise headspace control, since the sloping shoulders, while easing cartridge extraction, were unsuitable for this purpose.  Improved cartridge extraction reliability is desirable while hunting dangerous game, in particular when a fast follow-up shot is required.  The 7mm Remington Magnum is based on the commercial .264 Winchester Magnum, .338 Winchester Magnum, and .458 Winchester Magnum, which were based on the same belted .300 H&H Magnum and .375 H&H Magnum cases, trimmed to nearly the same length as the .270 Weatherby Magnum.

History 
On its introduction, the 7mm Remington Magnum substantially usurped the market share held by the .264 Winchester Magnum, which went into sharp decline in popularity and sales after 1962. By 1963 Winchester introduced the .300 Winchester Magnum to compete with Remington's new belted magnum cartridge. Both cartridges have remained the most popular magnum calibers among hunters and shooters ever since. 

Les Bowman, hunting editor and outfitter was much responsible for the development and introduction of the cartridige, as he noticed the need for a flat cartridge capable of taking elk-sized game to considerable ranges where he took his clients as the .300 Weatherby Magnum produced too much recoil for many hunters, resulting in poor shot placement, and the .270 Winchester, with the bullets available back in the day, weren't always as effective at longer distances and did not carry enough downrange energy. Thus, he found in the .275 Holland & Holland Magnum, a suitable alternative, but unavailable in the US.

Design
This is due both to the higher muzzle velocity of the magnum compared to the Springfield and that .284 diameter bullets tend to have better ballistic coefficients than .308 diameter bullets of comparable mass. Because of the smaller bullet diameter .284 diameter also have higher sectional density than .308 diameter bullets, and because of that better penetration in the target (it takes a 206-grain .308 diameter bullet to get the same sectional density as a 175-grain .284 bullet, an increased weight that requires 15-20% more muzzle energy to get the same muzzle velocity). The heaviest commercially loaded ammo available for the 7mm is 195 grains, while the .30-06 Springfield can be loaded with bullets up to 220 grains, but for a .308 caliber to equal the flat trajectory and penetration of a .284 diameter 180-grain bullet with a muzzle velocity of 2,860 ft/sec (870 m/s), as offered for the 7mm Remington Magnum, requires muzzle energy close to what the .300 Winchester Magnum can offer, i.e. well beyond what the .30-06 can deliver.

Cartridge dimensions
The 7mm Remington Magnum has 5.31 ml (82-grain) H2O cartridge case capacity.

7mm Remington Magnum maximum C.I.P. cartridge dimensions. All sizes in millimeters (mm).

Americans would define the shoulder angle at alpha/2 = 25 degrees. The common rifling twist rate for this cartridge is 241 mm (1 in 9.49 in), 6 grooves, Ø lands = 7.04 mm, Ø grooves = 7.21 mm, land width = 2.79 mm. The cartridge uses a large rifle magnum primer type.

According to the official C.I.P. (Commission Internationale Permanente pour l'Epreuve des Armes à Feu Portatives) rulings, the 7mm Remington Magnum case can handle up to  Pmax piezo pressure. In C.I.P. regulated countries every rifle cartridge combo has to be proofed at 125% of this maximum C.I.P. pressure to certify for sale to consumers.
This means that as of 2016, 7mm Remington Magnum chambered arms in C.I.P. regulated countries are proof tested at  PE piezo pressure.

The SAAMI maximum average pressure (MAP) for this cartridge is  piezo pressure.

Use

The 7mm Remington Magnum is basically a big game hunting cartridge capable of taking thin skinned game at considerable hunting ranges. Due to its high ballistic coefficient, which is common in all .284" caliber cartridges, the 7mm Rem Mag bucks wind efficiently. Because of its flat shooting nature and the relatively tolerable recoil, the 7mm Remington Magnum is especially popular for big-game hunting in Western Canada and in the United States, for plains game in Africa, and mountain hunting around the world. It has also been chambered in sniper rifles as the US Secret Service counter-sniper team has deployed this cartridge in urban areas along with the .300 Winchester Magnum.
Popular online gun author Chuck Hawks calls the 7mm Remington "one of the great all-around rifle cartridges."

Alternative cartridges
The 7mm Winchester Short Magnum cartridge, a rebated rim bottlenecked centerfire short magnum introduced in 2001, is probably the closest ballistic twin of the 7mm Remington Magnum. The 7mm Winchester Short Magnum is considerably shorter and fatter and has a steeper shoulder angle and a shorter neck (6.17 mm) than the 7mm Remington Magnum. This makes the 7mm Remington Magnum case with its 6.89 mm long neck better suited for loading long, heavier bullets. On the other hand, the proportions of 7mm Winchester Short Magnum promote good internal ballistic efficiency that allows the 7mm Winchester Short Magnum to fire shorter lighter bullets at slightly higher muzzle velocities while using less propellant than the classically proportioned 7mm Remington Magnum.

The commercially rarer 7mm Remington Short Action Ultra Magnum cartridge, a rebated rim bottlenecked centerfire short magnum introduced in 2002, is probably the other closest ballistic twin of the 7mm Remington Magnum. The 7mm Remington Short Action Ultra Magnum is considerably shorter and fatter and has a steeper shoulder angle and a longer neck (7.90 mm) than the 7mm Remington Magnum. This makes the 7mm Remington Short Action Ultra Magnum better suited for loading long heavier bullets.

These 21st-century ballistic twin short fat magnum cartridges can handle  Pmax piezo pressure according to the C.I.P. or a maximum average pressure  of  piezo pressure according to the SAAMI.

Another alternative cartridge that provides slightly improved ballistics over the .7mm Rem Mag, is the 7mm Weatherby Magnum, which though released to the market 18 years before, it never reached the popularity of the former, mainly because of Weatherby rifles' high price and since the barrels for Weatherby's cartrdige initially had a 1:12 twist, being too slow to stabilize heavier bullets.

Choice of bullet and barrel length
Bullet choice when reloading is critical, as bullet velocity at close ranges may result in less robust bullets disintegrating without providing significant penetration on especially tough game. Thus one would do well to use a premium bullet of some sort, for instance a bonded bullet. The choice of barrel length is also critical, as a  barrel is commonly needed to achieve the full velocity potential of the cartridge, and a  barrel should be viewed as a practical minimum.

See also
 .275 H&H Magnum
 .300 H&H Magnum
 .270 Weatherby Magnum
 7mm Weatherby Magnum
 7mm Remington cartridges
 List of rifle cartridges
 Table of handgun and rifle cartridges
 7mm caliber
 .280 Remington

References

External links

7mm Musings at Chuck Hawks
7mm Remington Mag at The Reload Bench

Pistol and rifle cartridges
Remington Magnum rifle cartridges